Ranulph or Ralph de Mortimer (before 1198 to 6 August 1246) was the second son of Roger de Mortimer and Isabel de Ferrers of Wigmore Castle in Herefordshire. He succeeded his elder brother before 23 November 1227 and built Cefnllys and Knucklas castles in 1240.

Marriage and issue
In 1230, Ralph married Princess Gwladus, daughter of Llywelyn ab Iorwerth and Joan, Lady of Wales (the only acknowledged, illegitimate daughter of John I of England). They had the following children:

 Roger Mortimer, 1st Baron Mortimer, in 1247, married Maud de Braose, by whom he had seven children.
 Hugh de Mortimer (d. 1273x4), lord of Chelmarsh.
 Peter or John Mortimer, a Franciscan friar in Shrewsbury.

References

 Remfry, P.M., Wigmore Castle Tourist Guide and the Family of Mortimer
 Ancestral Roots of Certain American Colonists Who Came to America Before 1700 by Frederick Lewis Weis; Lines 132C-29, 176B-28, 28–29, 67–29, 77–29, 176B-29
  A history of Wales from the earliest times to the Edwardian conquest (Longmans, Green & Co.) John Edward Lloyd (1911)

12th-century births
1246 deaths

Year of birth unknown

Anglo-Normans

People from Herefordshire
Ralph
Lords of Wigmore